Stelling is a surname. Notable people with the surname include:

Beth Stelling, American stand-up comedian and writer
Billy Stelling (born 1969), Dutch cricket player
Christopher Paul Stelling (born 1982), American singer-songwriter
Irene Stelling (born 1971), Danish women's footballer
Jack Stelling (born 1924), English footballer
Jeff Stelling (born 1955), English journalist and television presenter
Johannes Stelling (1877–1933), German activist and politician
Jos Stelling (born 1945), Dutch film director
Max Stelling (born 1994), English rugby union player

See also
Stelling House, a building in Copenhagen, Denmark
Stelling Minnis, a village in Kent, England
Stelling van Amsterdam, the Defence Line of Amsterdam, a World Heritage Site in the Netherlands
Steling, a mountain on the German-Belgian border